Humm Wye is an unincorporated community in Hardin County, Illinois, United States. Humm Wye is located at the intersection of Illinois Route 34 and Illinois Route 146, west of Elizabethtown.

References

Unincorporated communities in Hardin County, Illinois
Unincorporated communities in Illinois